Raphia sudanica is a palm species in the family Arecaceae. It is found in Western Africa, where it is locally used for construction purposes.

References

sudanica
Taxa named by Auguste Chevalier